Alice B. Overbey Taylor (1879 – 1919) was an American suffragist. She was the manager of the short-lived Virginia Suffrage News.

Biography
Taylor née Overbey was born on July 28, 1879, in Charlotte County, Virginia. On 20 September 1909 she married Doward Miles Taylor. The couple settled in Richmond, Virginia In the early 1910s Overbey became active in the suffragist movement. She was a member of the Equal Suffrage League of Virginia, serving as executive secretary and office manager from 1913 thorough 1915. In 1915 Taylor had a short story published in the American Home Journal. Around 1917, at the start of World War I, the Equal Suffrage League of Virginia added support of the American troops to their agenda. Taylor was appointed chair of the Committee of Agriculture and Thrift for the league. In 1918 Taylor became the league's chair of the Committee for the Protection of Women's Labor. The following year she was named program chair for the Richmond chapter of the Equal Suffrage League.

Taylor died of cancer on December 29, 1919, in Richmond.

Virginia Suffrage News

In 1914 Overbey created and funded the publication the Virginia Suffrage News. Taylor served as publisher and manager. Fellow suffragist Mary Ellen Pollard Clarke served as editor-in-chief. The first issue was published in Richmond on October 1, 1914, as the official organ of the Equal Suffrage League of Virginia. Due to Taylor's poor health, and lack of funding, the Virginia Suffrage News had only three issues, from October 1, 1914, through December 1, 1914.

References

External links
Virginia Suffrage News is available digitally at the Library of Virginia's Virginia Chronicle website
  

1879 births
1919 deaths
People from Virginia
Virginia suffrage

20th-century American women